Lee Si-a (born Lee Ji-a on July 10, 1990) is a South Korean actress and singer. She made her entertainment debut in 2011 as a member of the K-pop girl group .

Filmography

Television series

Film

Variety show

Music video

References 

1990 births
Living people
21st-century South Korean actresses
South Korean television actresses
South Korean film actresses
Actresses from Seoul
Singers from Seoul
Sungkyunkwan University alumni
21st-century South Korean singers